Clausilia dubia is a species of small, very elongate, left-handed air-breathing land snail, a sinistral terrestrial pulmonate gastropod mollusk in the family Clausiliidae, the door snails, all of which have a clausilium.

Subspecies
 Clausilia dubia alpicola Clessin, 1878
 Clausilia dubia bucculenta Klemm, 1960
 Clausilia dubia carpathica Brancsik, 1888
 Clausilia dubia dubia Draparnaud, 1805
 Clausilia dubia dydima F. J. Schmidt, 1847
 Clausilia dubia floningiana Westerlund, 1890
 Clausilia dubia geretica Bourguignat, 1877
 Clausilia dubia gracilior Clessin, 1887
 Clausilia dubia gratiosa Sajó, 1968
 Clausilia dubia grimmeri L. Pfeiffer, 1848
 Clausilia dubia huettneri Klemm, 1960
 Clausilia dubia ingenua Hudec & Brabenec, 1963
 Clausilia dubia kaeufeli Klemm, 1960
 Clausilia dubia otvinensis H. von Gallenstein, 1895
 Clausilia dubia runensis Tschapeck, 1883
 Clausilia dubia schlechtii A. Schmidt, 1856
 Clausilia dubia speciosa A. Schmidt, 1856
 Clausilia dubia suttoni Westerlund, 1881
 Clausilia dubia tettelbachiana Rossmässler, 1838
 Clausilia dubia vindobonensis A. Schmidt, 1856

Distribution
The species is widespread in Europe, living in countries and islands including (among others):

 Austria
 Czech Republic
 Great Britain, the north of England
 Slovakia
 Ukraine

Description
All the species of snails in the family of door snails are left-handed, which is an uncommon feature in gastropods in general. 
These snails have shells which are extremely high-spired, with numerous whorls.

Clausilia dubia is a relatively large species for this family, reaching 16 mm in height.

The weight of the adult live snail is about 123 mg.

References

 Bank, R. A.; Neubert, E. (2017). Checklist of the land and freshwater Gastropoda of Europe. Last update: July 16, 2017
  Sysoev, A. V. & Schileyko, A. A. (2009). Land snails and slugs of Russia and adjacent countries. Sofia/Moskva (Pensoft). 312 pp., 142 plates

dubia
Molluscs of Europe
Gastropods described in 1805